Larder Lake is an incorporated municipal township and eponymous constituent dispersed rural community in Timiskaming District in Northeastern Ontario, Canada. It is located along Ontario Highway 66 and Ontario Highway 624 at the north-western part of the lake bearing the same name.

Located within the "Larder Lake-Cadillac Fault Zone", a geologic region rich in precious metals, the town was the site of the first gold rush in northeastern Ontario.

History
In 2018, Beaverhouse First Nation submitted a claim to the Government of Ontario, asserting the community is a distinct First Nation and did not sign Treaty 9, or any other treaty. In April 2019, the government advised Beaverhouse First Nation Community that it will complete an assessment of the claim submission within three years. On April 19, 2022, Beaverhouse First Nation was officially recognized as a First Nation under Section 35 of Canada’s Constitution.

Gold in the area was originally reported in the late 1800’s by Chief Ignace Tonené of the Temagami First Nation. He staked a claim near the north arm of Larder Lake but claimed it was stolen. He reported it, but Indian Affairs was unable to help. Chief Tonenè Lake was named in his honour.

The discovery of silver in Cobalt, Ontario in 1903 led prospectors to search across northern Ontario for new finds.  The discovery of gold led to 4,000 claims by the winter of 1906 and the eventual development of the Omega (1936-1947), Chesterville (1938-1952), and Kerr Addison gold mines (started in 1936).

H.L. Kerr explored the Larder Lake area in 1904, but did not find gold.  He returned with his partner Bill Addison in 1906, and discovered traces of gold near the north arm of Larder Lake, next to Robert Reddick's claims.  Within months, 40 gold mining companies were established, and there was tremendous optimism and financial speculation.  A mining investment company published an advertisement in the Ottawa Citizen in 1907 stating: "The Larder Lake district is believed to be the richest gold country ever known, and it is just now being opened up.  Soon will commence the most tremendous outpouring of gold known to civilization."  Three-thousand men made their way to the area via canoe and portage to look for work, settling in a camp known as "Larder City".  Excitement led to disappointment, as no large deposits of gold were found, and most of the town was abandoned by 1911. The Kerr-Addison Gold Mine, between 1907 and 1911, was able to produce just $314 worth of gold, though that small output was used to mint Canada's first $5 gold pieces.

In 1936, a large gold deposit was discovered in Larder Lake, leading to the establishment of several productive mines. In total 13 million ounces of gold were produced in the area.

Ontario Highway 66 was built in the 1930s to connect the various mining towns in the region.  The highway connected Larder Lake to Kirkland Lake in the west, and to other mining communities to the east.  The section between Kirkland Lake and Larder Lake was paved in 1944.

In 1937, a boat traveling across Larder Lake to Miller Island on a fishing expedition capsized, killing all 7 on board. Searchers discovered the boat filled with water, and slowly began to recover bodies.  The boat's captain, John C. Skinner, Chief Engineer of the Lake Shore Mining Company, had been warned by a forest ranger that the weather conditions were too dangerous for the journey.

The Lakeshore Hotel was destroyed by fire in 1938.  Guests lost all their belongings, though no injuries were reported.

By 1941, labourers at Larder Lake's Omega Gold Mine were earning $4.64 per day, and the mine captain was earning $8.70 per day.  Omega was awarded the John T. Ryan Trophy in 1943 by the Canadian Institute of Mining, Metallurgy and Petroleum for having the lowest accident frequency in Canada during the previous year.

The Catholic church in Larder Lake caught fire in 1947, just moments after Sunday mass.  No injuries were reported, though all sacred vessels, organ drapes, vestments and pews were destroyed.

In 1952, the Larder Lake Fire Department took first place in a regional competition of the Timiskaming Firemen's Association, beating 22 other fire brigades.

Larder Lake's train station, located north-east of the town, was the site of a large robbery in 1965.  Five gold bars worth $165,000 were awaiting shipment to the mint in Ottawa, when 4 armed men broke in.  A float plane in Larder Lake was believed used in the getaway.

Approximately  of forest southwest of Larder Lake suffered blowdown.

The 2010 Winter Olympics torch relay passed through Larder Lake on January 1, 2010.

Demographics 

See also
Larder Lake
Dobie, Ontario - community to the west of Larder Lake
Virginiatown, Ontario - community to the east of Larder Lake
List of townships in Ontario
List of francophone communities in Ontario

References

External links

Municipalities in Timiskaming District
Single-tier municipalities in Ontario
Township municipalities in Ontario